Masaram Gondi is a Unicode block containing characters from the Masaram Gondi script, which was designed for writing Gondi in 1918 by Munshi Mangal Singh Masaram, a Gond from Balaghat district of Madhya Pradesh, India.

Block

History
The following Unicode-related documents record the purpose and process of defining specific characters in the Masaram Gondi block:

References 

Unicode blocks